Extreme Noise Terror is the sixth studio album by English grindcore band Extreme Noise Terror. It was released on 6 November 2015, by Willowtip Records. The album marks the return of their hardcore punk roots with highly aggressive raw sound and the first album to feature Desecration bassist Andi Morris and The Rotted former vocalist Ben McCrow.

Track listing

Personnel
Extreme Noise Terror
Dean Jones – vocals
Ben McCrow – vocals
Paul Woodfield – lead guitar
Ollie Jones – rhythm guitar
Andi Morris – bass
Barney Monger – drums

Session musician
Kody Minus – lead guitar

Production
Dean Jones – engineering, mixing, artwork
Mark Harwood – engineering, mixing, production
Martina Seric – artwork
Maja Jones – artwork

References

2015 albums
Extreme Noise Terror albums
Willowtip Records albums